This is the discography of Swedish dance/pop group Alcazar, who have released three studio albums on Sony BMG, one compilation and one EP album

Alcazar rose to fame with their debut album, Casino, and its third single, "Crying at the Discoteque". It produced a chain of singles including the internationally successful "Sexual Guarantee", and "Don't You Want Me". After Casino and an unsuccessful attempt to win Melodifestivalen 2003 with the song "Not a Sinner Nor a Saint", they released their second studio album, Alcazarized, which was commercially successful and produced a few international singles, such as "Not a Sinner Nor a Saint", "Ménage à Trois" and "This Is the World We Live In".

Albums

Studio albums

Compilation albums

Live albums

Singles

Music videos

B-sides

References

Discography
Pop music group discographies
Discographies of Swedish artists